The 2014 Murray State Racers football team represented Murray State University in the 2014 NCAA Division I FCS football season. They were led by fifth-year head coach Chris Hatcher and played their home games at Roy Stewart Stadium. They were a member of the Ohio Valley Conference. They finished the season 3–9, 1–7 in OVC play to finish in a tie for eighth place.

On December 11, head coach Chris Hatcher resigned to take the same position at Samford. He finished at Murray State with a five-year record of 27–30.

Schedule

Source: Schedule

References

Murray State
Murray State Racers football seasons
Murray State Racers football